North Karnataka is a geographical region in Deccan plateau from  elevation that constitutes the region of the Karnataka state in India and the region consists of 13 districts. It is drained by the Krishna River and its tributaries the Bhima, Ghataprabha, Malaprabha, and Tungabhadra. North Karnataka lies within the Deccan thorn scrub forests ecoregion, which extends north into eastern Maharashtra. 

North Karnataka consists of total 13 districts and comprises the regions known as (Hyderabad-Karnataka) - Kalaburagi division  and (Bombay-Karnataka) - Belagavi division. It includes districts of Bagalkote, Bijapur, Gadag, Dharwad, Haveri, Belagavi, Bellary, Bidar, Kalaburagi, Koppal, Raichur, Vijayanagara and Yadgir.

Transport

Bus 
 North Western Karnataka Road Transport Corporation NWKRTC, serves the north western part of Karnataka.
 Kalyana Karnataka Road Transport Corporation KKRTC, serves the north eastern part of Karnataka

Air 
Airports in the region are 
 Belgaum Airport
 Hubli Airport
 Jindal Vijaynagar Airport
 Bidar Airport
 Gulbarga Airport

Airlines and destinations

Belgaum Airport  is an airport in Belgaum, a city in the Indian state of Karnataka. Built in 1942 by the Royal Air Force (RAF), Belgaum Airport is the oldest airport in North Karnataka. The RAF used the airport as a training site during World War II, providing support to the South East Asia Command. The new terminal building was inaugurated by Civil aviation minister Ashok Gajapathi Raju on 14 September 2017. The airport is also home to an Indian Air Force station at which new recruits to the military receive basic training.

Hubli Airport ] is a domestic airport serving the twin cities of Hubli and Dharwad in the state of Karnataka, India. Hubli airport will be upgraded to international airport. Around 700 acres of land acquisition is under process and 245 crores have been already released for acquisition.

History of North Karnataka

Prehistoric period  

North Karnataka's history and culture date back to prehistoric times. The earliest Stone Age find in India was a hand ax at Lingasugur, in Raichur district. Sangankal Hills in the Bellary district, which is known as the earliest village settlement of South India, dates back to the Neolithic period. Iron weapons from 1200 BC, found at Hallur in Dharwad district, demonstrate that North Karnataka used iron earlier than northern India.
Prehistoric sites in North Karnataka include rock shelters in Bellary, Raichur and Koppal districts with red paintings which include figures of wild animals. The paintings are done in such a way that the walls of caves are not facing northwest, so the northwest monsoon does not affect them. These rock shelters are found at Kurgod, Hampi in Bellary district and Hire Benakal, near Gangavati in the Koppal district. Burial chambers using granite slabs (known as dolmens) are also found; the best examples are the dolmens of Hire Benakal and Kumati in Hadagali Taluk.

Vibhuthihalli at Shahapur Taluk in the Yadgir district, an Archaeological Survey of India ancient astronomy site, was created with megalithic stones. Ashoka's stone edicts, found in the state, indicate that major parts of Northern Karnataka were under the Mauryas. Many dynasties left their imprint upon the development of North Karnatakan art, among them the Chalukyas, the Vijayanagara Empire and the Western Chalukyas. The inscriptions related to Chutu dynasty are the oldest documents found in North Karnataka.

Ancient
 Kishkindha
 Karnata Kingdom
 Mauryas
 Shatavahana dynasty (until early third century CE)
 Chutus of Banavasi  (vassal to the Satavahanas)
 Kurus of Belgaum of 30 BC-65/70 AD.

Chalukyas

Chalukya rule is important in the development of architecture known as Karnata Dravida. Hundreds of monuments built by the Chalukyas are found in the Malaprabha river basin (mainly in Aihole, Badami, Pattadakal and Mahakuta, in Karnataka). They ruled an empire extending from the Kaveri in the south to the Narmada in the north. The Badami Chalukya dynasty was established by Pulakeshin I in 543; Vatapi (Badami) was the capital. Pulakeshin II was a popular emperor of the Badami Chalukya dynasty. He defeated Harshavardhana on the banks of the Narmada river, and defeated Vishnukundins in the south. Vikramaditya I, known as Rajamalla and for building temples, engraved a Kannada inscription on the victory pillar at the Kailasanatha Temple. Kirtivarman II was the last Badami Chalukya king, overthrown in 753 by the Rashtrakuta King Dantidurga.

The Western Chalukya dynasty is sometimes called the Kalyani Chalukyas, after its regal capital at Kalyani (today's Basavakalyan in Karnataka) or the Later Chalukya from its theoretical relationship to the sixth-century Badami Chalukyas. The Western Chalukyas developed an architectural style (also called Gadag style) known today as a transitional style, an architectural link between the early Chalukya Dynasty and the later Hoysala empire. The Chalukyas built some of the earliest Hindu temples in India. The best-known examples are the Mahadeva Temple (Itagi) in the Koppal District; the Kasivisvesvara Temple at Lakkundi in the Gadag District and the Mallikarjuna Temple at Kuruvatti and the Kallesvara Temple at Bagali, both in the Davangere District. Monuments notable for craftsmanship are the Siddhesvara Temple at Haveri in the Haveri District, the Amrutesvara Temple at Annigeri in the Dharwad District, the Sarasvati Temple in Gadag, and the Dodda Basappa Temple at Dambal (both in the Gadag district). Aihole was an experimental base for architectural creation.

Badami Chalukyas and Kalyana chalukyas also known as (Kuntaleshvaras).

Kadambas

The Kadambas were an ancient dynasty of South India who primarily ruled the region which is the present-day Goa state and the nearby Konkan region (part of modern Maharashtra and Karnataka state). The early rulers of this dynasty
established themselves at Vaijayanti (or Banavasi) in 345 AD and ruled for more than two centuries. In 607, the Chalukyas of Vatapi sacked Banavasi, and the Kadamba kingdom was incorporated into the expanding Chalukyan empire. In the eighth century, the Chalukyas were overthrown by the Rashtrakutas, who ruled until the 10th century. In 980, descendants of the Chalukyas and Kadambas revolted against the Rashtrakutas; the Rashtrakuta empire fell, resulting in the establishment of a second Chalukyan dynasty (known as the Western Chalukyas). Chatta Deva, a member of the Kadamba family who helped the Western Chalukyas in this coup, re-established the Kadamba dynasty. He was primarily a vassal of the Western Chalukyas, but his successors enjoyed considerable independence and were well-placed in Goa and Konkan until the 14th century. The successors of Chatta Deva occupied both Banavasi and Hangal, and are known as the Kadambas of Hangal. Later, the Kadambas paid nominal allegiance to the other major powers of the Deccan Plateau (such as the Yadavas and Hoysalas of Dorasamudra) and maintained their independence. Four families of Kadambas ruled in southern India: the Kadamba of Hangal, Goa, Belur and Banvasi.

Rashtrakutas  

During the rule of Dantidurga, an empire was built with the Gulbarga region in modern Karnataka as its base. This clan came to be known as the Rashtrakutas of Manyakheta (Kannada: ರಾಷ್ಟ್ರಕೂಟ), who rose to power in 753.  During their rule, Jain mathematicians and scholars contributed important works in Kannada and Sanskrit. Amoghavarsha I was the best-known king of this dynasty and wrote Kavirajamarga, a landmark Kannada work. Architecture reached a high-water mark in the Dravidian style, the best examples of which are seen in the Kailash Temple at Ellora, the sculptures of Elephanta Caves in modern-day Maharashtra and the Kashivishvanatha and the Jain Narayana Temples at Pattadakal in modern North Karnataka (all of which are UNESCO World Heritage Sites). Scholars agree that the kings of the imperial dynasty in the eighth to tenth century made the Kannada language as important as Sanskrit. Rashtrakuta inscriptions appear in both Kannada and Sanskrit, and the kings encouraged literature in both languages. The earliest existing Kannada literary writings are credited to their court poets and royalty.  Kailash Temple is an example of Dravidian art. This project was started by Krishna I (757–773) of the Rashtrakuta dynasty which ruled from Manyakheta in modern Karnataka. It is located 40 km from the city of Manyakheta (modern Malkhed), on the banks of the Kagini River in Kalaburagi district.

Carnatic expansion

Vijayanagara empire

Vijayanagara (Karnata Empire, or Karnataka Empire) is considered the greatest medieval Hindu empire and one of the greatest in the world at that time. It fostered the development of intellectual pursuits and the fine arts. Abdur Razzaq (the Persian ambassador) said, "The eye of the pupil has never seen a place like it and the ear of intelligence has never been informed that there existed anything to equal it in the world".

Deccan Sultanates
The Vijayanagara Empire, with its capital at Hampi, lost to the army of the Deccan Sultanates in 1565. As a consequence of this, Bijapur became the most important city of the region. It is a land of monuments; perhaps no other city except Delhi has as many monuments as Bijapur.

Maratha Empire
The region of North Karnataka, especially Belgaum, Dharwad and parts of Bagalkot, Bijapur and Gulbarga districts came under the influence of Shivaji and subsequently the Peshwas. As early as 1680s, many Marathi communities including Marathas and Marathi Brahmin started settling in the region. Most of these came down as soldiers and administrators and were awarded large grants of land. The Patwardhan family of Jamkhandi and Bijapur, Desai of Nuggikeri and Kundgol and Deshpande families in Dharwad, Belgaum and neighboring districts are some of the prominent Brahmin families which trace their ancestry to these migrations. While many of these families adopted to Kannada language, most people remain bilingual and marry into Marathi Brahmin families. The Ghorpade dynasty in Sandur State and Mudhol State are some of the prominent Maratha families who trace their ancestry to similar migrations.

Minor dynasties
 Rattas of Saundatti (of Belgaum)
 Guttas of Guttal (Dharwad region)
 Sendrakas of Nagarkhanda (Banavasi province)
 Sindas of Yalaburga (Bijapur-Gulbarga)
 Kadamba of Hangal
 Naiks of Kanakagiri
 Shilahara

Other kingdoms  
 Seuna Yadavas of Devagiri, 9th–14th century
 Ratta dynasty
 Kalachuris of Kalyani, 12th century
 Kampili, 13th century
 Sangama Dynasty
 Saluva Dynasty

Inscriptions

 Mahakuta Inscriptions, Mahakuta Mahakutesvara temple Pillar inscription
 Aihole inscription
 Badami inscriptions
 Kappe Arabhatta inscription
 Itagi Mahadeva Temple Inscription
 Lakkundi inscriptions
 Gadag inscription
 Halasi inscriptions

North Karnataka historical sites

Princely states
The following are the princely states of British India:
 Mudhol State
 Sandur State
 Savanur State
 Ramdurg State
 Jamkhandi State
 Kittur
 Shorapur
 Gurgunta
 Gajendragad shivaji fort
 Kannada-speaking Hyderabad State
 South Kannada-speaking Bombay state

Battles
 Chalukya Pallava Wars
 Battle of Talikota
 Battle of Gajendragad
 Battle of Raichur
 Chola-Chalukya wars

Historic capitals  
 Palashika (Halasi, or Halsi, or Halshi in Belgaum district) - Kadamba of Halasi
 Hanungal, or Panungal (Hangal in Haveri district) - Kadambas of Hangal
 Aihole in Bagalkot district - First capital of Badami Chalukyas
 Vatapi (Badami in Bagalkot district) - Badami Chalukyas
 Pattadakal in Bagalkot district - Briefly third capital of Badami Chalukyas
 Mayurkhandi in Bidar district - First capital of Rashtrakuta dynasty
 Manyakheta (Malkhed in Kalaburagi district) - Rashtrakuta dynasty
 Kalyani (Basava Kalyana in Bidar district) - Western Chalukyas
 Kundal (Kundal village near sangli in Sangli district) - Western Chalukyas
 Annigeri in Dharwad district - Western Chalukyas (last capital of the Chalukyas)
 Sudi in Gadag district - Coin mint and capital of Western Chalukyas
 Lakkundi in Gadag district - Coin mint of Western Chalukyas
 Vijayanagara (Hampi in Bellary district) - Vijayanagara Empire
 Gulbarga - Bahamani Sultanate
 Bidar - Bahamani Sultanate
 Bijapur - Adil Shahi dynasty (Bijapur Sultanate)

Architectural styles 

North Karnataka has contributed to various styles of Indian Architecture during the rule of the Kadamba, Badami Chalukyas, Western Chalukya, Rashtrakuta and Vijayanagara empires:
 Vesara style
 Badami Chalukya architecture
 Gadag style of architecture
 Rashtrakutas style of architecture
 Vijayanagara Architecture
 Kadamba architecture
 Bijapur style
 Keladi Nayaka style

History of Kannada language

Kannada is one of the oldest Dravidian languages, with an age of at least 2,000 years. The spoken language is said to have separated from its proto-Dravidian source later than Tamil, and at about the same time as Tulu. However, the archaeological evidence indicates a written tradition for this language of around 1,500–1,600 years. The initial development of Kannada is similar to that of other Dravidian languages and independent of Sanskrit. In later centuries, Kannada has been greatly influenced by Sanskrit in vocabulary, grammar and literary style.

As for the Dravidian race, the Monier-Williams Sanskrit Dictionary lists for the Sanskrit word draviḍa a meaning of a "collective name for Karnatakas, Gurjaras, Kannadigas and Mahārāstras". North Karnataka has its own dialect of Kannada.

 Old Kannada literature
 Kadamba script, Halegannada
 Chalukya Literature
 Kannada literature in the Western Chalukya Empire
 Rashtrakuta literature, Asaga, Amoghavarsha I, Kavirajamarga
 Extinct Kannada literature
 Kappe Arabhatta inscription at Badami
 Adikavi Pampa, Sri Ponna, Ranna
 Medieval Kannada literature
 Kannada literature in Vijayanagara empire
 Vachana sahitya, Basavanna, Akka Mahadevi
 Kumaravyasa, Karnata Bharata Kathamanjari (Mahabharata in Kannada)

Unification of Karnataka

 The role of North Karnataka in Unification of Karnataka
 Unification of Karnataka and Vidyavardhaka Sangha
 Unification of Karnataka and Aluru Venkata Rao
 The Belgaum Conference of 1924
 Liberation of Kalyana Karnataka (Hyderabad-Karnataka)

Festivals
In Kannada utsava means "festival". 
The following are festivals celebrated in North Karnataka sponsored by Govt of Karnataka
 Gadag Utsava
 Chalukya Utsava
 Pattadakal Utsava
 Hampi Utsava
 Lakkundi Utsava
 Kittur Utsava
 Bidar Utsava
 Dharwad Utsava
 Kanakagiri Utsava
 Navaraspur Utsava at (Bijapur)
 Sawai Gandharva Festival at Kundgol
 Vishwa Kannada Sammelana held at Belgaum

Tourism

Temples of North Karnataka
The temples of North Karnataka may be categorised as historical or modern.

World Heritage Sites
 Hampi: Near Hospet in Bellary district
 Pattadakal: Near Badami in Bagalkot district
world's 2nd Largest Dome Golagumatta Vijayapur
 Ibrahim Rosaa also called Black Tajamahal,VIJAYAPUR

National park and sanctuaries in North Karnataka

 Ranibennur Blackbuck Sanctuary
 Daroji Sloth Bear Sanctuary
 Bhimgad Wildlife Sanctuary
 Bonal Bird Sanctuary
 Ghataprabha Bird Sanctuary
 Attiveri Bird Sanctuary
 Magadi Bird Sanctuary
 Gudavi Bird Sanctuary
 Yedahalli Chinkara Wildlife Sanctuary, Mudhol- Bilagi
Utsav Rock Garden is a sculptural Garden located near NH-4 Pune-Bangalore road, Gotagodi Village, Shiggaon Taluk, Haveri District, Karnataka. Utsav Rock Garden is an sculptural garden representing contemporary art and rural culture. A typical village is created where men and women are involved in their daily household activities. A unique picnic spot which delights common people, educated and intellectuals. There are more than 1000 sculptures in the garden of different sizes. It is an anthropological museum. It represents traditional farming, crafts, folklore, cattle herding and sheep rearing.

Notable people of North Karnataka

Universities and other educational institutions
 Sri Taralabalu Jagadguru Institute of Technology, Ranebennur
 Karnataka State Rural Development and Panchayat Raj University, Gadag
 Indian Institute of Technology, Dharwad
 Indian Institute of Information Technology, Dharwad
 Karnataka University, Dharwad
 University of Agricultural Sciences, Dharwad
 SDM college of Dental Sciences, Dharwad
 S.D.M College of Engineering & Technology, Dharwad
 Karnatak Science College, Dharwad
 Karnataka State Law University, Hubli 
 KLE Technological University, Hubli
 Karnataka Institute of Medical Sciences, Hubli
 Visvesvaraya Technological University, Belgaum
 Jawaharlal Nehru Medical College, Belgaum
 Central University of Karnataka, Gulbarga
 Kannada University, Hampi
 Gulbarga University, Gulbarga
 Karnataka State Women University, Bijapur
 Karnataka Veterinary, Animal and Fisheries Sciences University, Bidar
 Basaveshwar Engineering College, Bagalkot
 Vijayanagara Institute of Medical Sciences, Bellary
 Sainik School, Bijapur
 S Nijalingappa Medical College, HSK (Hanagal Shree Kumareshwar) Hospital and Research Centre, Bagalkot
 Karnataka Folklore University, Shiggaon

Arts and crafts

 Kasuti embroidery: putting stitches by hand on dresswear like Ilkal sarees. Lambanis of Bellary district have their own embroidery style.
 Bidriware: metal handicraft originated in Bidar during the rule of the Bahamani Sultans
 Kinhal Crafts: originated in Kinhal (Kinnal) in Koppal district. Crafts are mainly toys, wood carvings and mural paintings.
 Gokak toys: originated in Gokak in Belgaum district.

Natural resources  

The Hutti Gold Mine is the only gold-extraction company in India. It operates in Hatti, an ancient gold- mining area about 70 km from Raichur. Tourism is also permitted inside the mine. The Gadag, Koppal and Bellary districts are rich in manganese, gold and iron ore. Kalaburagi district is rich in lime

Religion

Hinduism

Lingayatism

The followers of Basavanna and Panchacharyas who worship god through "istalinga". Lingayatism is a sect of Hinduism and worship Shiva in the form of Linga.

Brahmins

Varna (class) in Hinduism specialising as priests, teachers (Acharyaru) and protectors of sacred learning across generations are known as Brahmanaru.

Buddhism

Buddhism in North Karnataka dates from the third to the first centuries BC. Sannati and Kanaganahalli are two important excavation sites, and there is a Tibetan Buddhist colony at Mundgod.

Jainism

Banjara
Banjara's are the followers of Shaktism and Sevalal]

See also
 Temples of North Karnataka
 List of North Karnataka historical sites
 Chalukya
 Western Chalukya Architecture
 Western Chalukya
 Vijayanagar Architecture
 Dravidian architecture
 Badami Chalukya Architecture
 Tourism in North Karnataka
 Bayaluseemae
 Siddis of Karnataka
 Family names in North Karnataka
 Timeline of Maharashtra history
 Deccan States Agency
 Shilahara used Kannada as official language
 South Western Railway zone

External links
 Discovering Deccan - Badami, Aihole, Pattadakal, Bijapur Gulbarga, Bidar and Hampi
 Celebrating our heritage
 Early Chalukyas - Maharashtra Gazetteer
 The Kadamba Kula: A History of Ancient and Mediaeval Karnataka

References 

Culture of Karnataka
Regions of Karnataka
History of Karnataka
Regions of India
Karu Nadu